Gregory is a lunar impact crater on the far side of the Moon. It is named after the 17th century Scottish astronomer and mathematician James Gregory. It is located to the southeast of the crater Ibn Firnas, and north-northeast of Bečvář. About one crater diameter to the north is the smaller Morozov.

This is a worn and eroded crater formation. The northern rim is degraded due to impacts. Attached to the exterior of the southwest is Gregory Q, a satellite crater about the same size as Gregory. Within the interior is the remains of a small crater rim along the northwestern inner wall. To the east of Gregory and leading away to the southeast is a crater chain designated Catena Gregory.

Satellite craters
By convention these features are identified on lunar maps by placing the letter on the side of the crater midpoint that is closest to Gregory.

References

External links

Gregory at The Moon Wiki

Impact craters on the Moon